Stagmatoptera hyaloptera, common name Argentine white-crested mantis, is a species of praying mantis found in Argentina.

See also
List of mantis genera and species

References

hyaloptera
Mantodea of South America
Fauna of Argentina
Insects described in 1832
Insects of South America